Jamie Johnson may refer to:
 Jamie Johnson (filmmaker) (born 1979), American documentary film filmmaker
 Jamie Johnson (judoka) (born 1972), British judoka
 Jamie Johnson (born 1972), founding member of The Grascals
 Jamie Haskell or Jamie Johnson (born 1980), American curler
 Jamie Johnson (ice hockey) (born 1982), Canadian professional ice hockey player
 Jamie Johnson (singer) (fl. 2010s), contestant on The Voice UK
 Jamie Johnson (TV series), a BBC children's television series

See also
 James Johnson (disambiguation)
 Jamey Johnson (born 1975), American Country music artist
 Jamie Johnston (born 1989), Canadian actor

Johnson, Jamie